Iowa State Preserves tend to be small parcels of land with some historic or environmental significance. The arrangement is alphabetic. This is based on information found at a website maintained by the Iowa Department of Natural Resources.

A.F. Miller State Preserve
Ames High Prairie State Preserve
Anderson Prairie State Preserve
Behrens Pond and Woodlands State Preserve
Berry Woods State Preserve
Bird Hill State Preserve
Bixby State Preserve
Bluffton Fir Stand State Preserve
Brush Creek Canyon State Preserve
Brushy Creek State Preserve
Cameron Woods State Preserve
Casey's Paha State Preserve
Catfish Creek State Preserve
Cayler Prairie State Preserve
Cedar Bluffs State Preserve
Cedar Hills Sand Prairie State Preserve
Cheever Lake State Preserve
Clay Prairie State Preserve
Claybanks Forest State Preserve
Cold Water Spring State Preserve
Crossman Prairie State Preserve
Decorah Ice Cave State Preserve
Dinesen Prairie State Preserve
Doolittle Prairie State Preserve
Fallen Rock State Preserve
Fish Farm Mounds State Preserve
Five Ridge Prairie State Preserve
Fleming Woods State Preserve
Fort Atkinson State Preserve
Freda Haffner Kettlehole State Preserve
Gitchie Manitou State Preserve
Hanging Bog State Preserve
Hardin City Woodland State Preserve
Hartley Fort State Preserve
Hayden Prairie State Preserve
Hoffman Prairie State Preserve
Indian Bluffs Primitive Area State Preserve
Indian Fish Trap State Preserve
Kalsow Prairie State Preserve
Kish-Ke-Kosh Prairie State Preserve
Lamson Woods State Preserve
Liska-Stanek Prairie State Preserve
Little Maquoketa River Mounds State Preserve
Malanaphy Springs State Preserve
Malchow Mounds State Preserve
Manikowski Prairie State Preserve
Mann Wilderness Area State Preserve
Marietta Sand Prairie State Preserve
Mericle Woods State Preserve
Merrill A. Stainbrook State Preserve
Merritt Forest State Preserve
Montauk State Preserve
Mossy Glen State Preserve
Mount Pisgah Cemetery State Preserve
Mount Talbot State Preserve
Nestor Stiles Prairie State Preserve
Ocheyedan Mound State Preserve
Old State Quarry State Preserve
Palisades-Downs State Preserve
Pecan Grove State Preserve
Pellett Woods State Preserve
Pilot Grove State Preserve
Pilot Knob State Preserve
Retz Woods State Preserve
Roberts Creek State Preserve
Rock Creek Island State Preserve
Rock Island State Preserve
Roggman Boreal Slopes State Preserve
Rolling Thunder Prairie State Preserve
Saint James Lutheran Church State Preserve
Savage Woods State Preserve
Searryl's Cave State Preserve
Sheeder Prairie State Preserve
Silver Lake Fen State Preserve
Silvers-Smith Woods State Preserve
Slinde Mounds State Preserve
Starr's Cave State Preserve
Steele Prairie State Preserve
Stinson Prairie State Preserve
Strasser Woods State Preserve
Sylvan Runkel State Preserve
Toolesboro Mounds State Preserve
Turin Loess Hills State Preserve
Turkey River Mounds State Preserve
White Pine Hollow State Preserve
Williams Prairie State Preserve
Wittrock Indian Village State Preserve
Woodland Mounds State Preserve
Woodman Hollow State Preserve
Woodthrush State Preserve

External links 

Iowa State Preserves guide (with listing of all 95 locations)

 
Iowa State Preserves
State preserves